This is the discography of British indie pop band Felt.

Albums

Studio albums

Compilation albums

Video albums

Singles

References

Discographies of British artists
Pop music group discographies
Rock music group discographies